Vegetarian diet may refer to:
Vegetarianism
Vegetarian cuisine
Plant-based diet (i.e., not necessarily stemming from vegetarian beliefs)
Veganism